Leleni is a village and seat (chef-lieu) of the commune of Logouana in the Cercle of Koutiala in the Sikasso Region of southern Mali.

References

Populated places in Sikasso Region